The 2015 Fylde Borough Council election took place on 7 May 2015 to elect members of Fylde Borough Council in England. It was held on the same day as other local elections.

References

2015 English local elections
May 2015 events in the United Kingdom
2015
2010s in Lancashire